Our Inventions is the fourth studio album by German electronic music band Lali Puna. It was released on 1 April 2010 by Morr Music.

Track listing

Personnel
Credits are adapted from the album's liner notes.

Lali Puna
 Valerie Trebeljahr
 Markus Acher
 Christoph Brandner
 Christian Heiß

Additional musicians
 Karl Ivar Refseth – percussion, vibraphone
 Yukihiro Takahashi – performance on "Out There"

Production
 Tomohiko Gondo – additional production on "Out There"
 Christian Heiß – recording
 Sean Magee – mastering
 Yukihiro Takahashi – additional production on "Out There"
 Oliver Zülch – mixing, additional production and recording

Design
 Julia Guther – artwork
 Verena Spring – costume design (paper dress)
 Gerald von Foris – photography

References

External links
 

2010 albums
Lali Puna albums
Morr Music albums